Kuru (after Kurukullā, a Tibetan Buddhist deity) is a genus of dromaeosaurid theropod from the Late Cretaceous Barun Goyot Formation of Mongolia. The genus contains a single species, Kuru kulla, known from a fragmentary skeleton including a partial skull.

Discovery and naming
The holotype of Kuru kulla, IGM 100/981, was discovered by an American-Mongolian expedition at Khulsan in the Gobi Desert, Mongolia, on 5 July 1991, only hours before the discovery of Shri devi. The following year, it was reported as a distinct dromaeosaurid taxon at an SVP conference in Toronto. In their paper describing the dromaeosaurid Achillobator, Perle et al. (1999) listed a bibliographic entry titled "Morphology Dromaeosaurian dinosaur-Airakoraptor from the upper cretaceous of Mongolia".

However, this bibliographic entry is clearly in error as no since paper existed and is definitely a reference to the SVP 1992 abstract, in which case "Airakoraptor" is a nomen nudum for IGM 100/981. Napoli et al. presumes the name "Airakoraptor" means "Kumis thief", after kumis, also known as airag or airak, a mare- or donkey-milk product made in Central Asia. In 1997 and 1999, the specimen was identified under the correct accession number in the scientific literature.

In 2006, its surangular bone was described when Tsaagan was named. Nevertheless, still in 2007 it was confused with the so-called Zos Wash specimen found in 1998, which in fact has the accession number IGM 100/3503. The specimen IGM 100/981 was finally described in 2021 as the new genus and species Kuru kulla by James G. Napoli, Alexander Altieri Ruebenstahl, Bhart-Aanjan Singh Bhullar, Alan Hamilton Turner and  Mark Allen Norell.

Classification 
Phylogenetic analysis places Kuru as the sister taxon of Adasaurus from the slightly later Nemegt Formation. A simplified version of said phylogenetic analysis is shown below:

See also 

 List of dinosaur genera

References

Eudromaeosaurs
Maastrichtian life
Late Cretaceous dinosaurs of Asia
Cretaceous Mongolia
Fossils of Mongolia
Barun Goyot Formation
Fossil taxa described in 2021